Cardiff Horse Show, also the Cardiff and South Wales Horse Show or Royal Horse Show was an annual horse show in May in Cardiff, south Wales in the late 19th and early 20th centuries.
It attracted farmers from all across Glamorganshire. It was held at Sophia Gardens.

References

Sport in Cardiff
Equestrian sports in the United Kingdom
Equestrian sports in Wales
Horse showing and exhibition
Agricultural shows in Wales